"That's How I Beat Shaq" is a single from Aaron Carter's second  album, Aaron's Party (Come Get It). Released in 2001, the single was released with the permission of Shaquille O'Neal. The song was used in the trailer for Hey Arnold!: The Movie.

Music video
The video begins with Aaron riding a scooter with a dog playing Frisbee, followed by various scenes of Aaron playing basketball. It then shifts to him telling the story of how he met Shaquille O'Neal, who challenges him to a one-on-one basketball game. In the second verse, Aaron plans to distract Shaq in order to score points. Aaron finally emerges victorious, but it turns out that everything was a dream when Aaron hears his mother's voice. He is shocked, however, when he sees the jersey of Shaquille O'Neal. Throughout the video, Aaron is seen rapping in the basketball court and in the hoop.

Rematch
On the March 7, 2013 episode of Upload with Shaquille O'Neal, Shaq challenged Aaron Carter to a rematch after 12 years since the song. Shaq makes a deal that if Aaron Carter scores a single hoop against Shaq, the ex-Laker will donate $5,000 to the charity of Aaron's choice; Aaron replies that he is playing for The Aaron Carter Needs a Jet Ski Foundation. The game starts with the two staring each other down. Shaq steals the ball from Aaron and proceeds to score over 20 points, while Aaron can't make a single hoop. During the break, Shaq is seen eating nachos and offers some to Aaron, but then smacks them to the ground before Aaron can take any. The game continues with Aaron unable to score a single hoop. It then cuts back to the two staring and Aaron attempting again to score a single hoop with Shaq successfully preventing him. Aaron then reveals that the music video was only a joke which Shaq eventually understands in a somewhat sarcastic manner.

Track listing
Single – Aaron Carter – "That's How I Beat Shaq" (2001, CD)
"That's How I Beat Shaq" – 3:24
"One for the Summer" – 3:44

Charts

In popular culture
"That's How I Beat Shaq" was used in the trailer for Hey Arnold!: The Movie.

The comic strip xkcd's "Future Archaeology" imagines a time traveler visiting today from a future where only two texts from our era survive. One is the story of Noah building an ark and "The other is an account of how a man named Aaron Carter defeated a god named Shaq," a reference to this song.

In the Lemon Demon song "The Ultimate Showdown of Ultimate Destiny", Shaquille O'Neal lunges toward Godzilla and "proceeded to open up a can of Shaq Fu, when Aaron Carter came out of the blue and he started beating up Shaquille O'Neal," until they both get run over by the Batmobile.

The Lonely Island song "Rocky", from the album Turtleneck & Chain is a parody of this song, imitating the style with a story about an underdog boxer who fights fictional boxer Rocky Balboa and loses. This song is referenced in the first line: "Here's a little story that I think you'll like / It's not about Shaq or Iron Mike."

The Neil Cicierega song "Aaron" is a minor key remix of this song.

References

2000 songs
2001 singles
Aaron Carter songs
Comedy rap songs
Jive Records singles
Shaquille O'Neal
Songs written by Brian Kierulf
Songs written by Josh Schwartz
Songs about basketball players
Cultural depictions of basketball players